Aleksandr Anatolyevich Butko (born 18 March 1986) is a Russian volleyball player, a member of Russia men's national volleyball team and Russian club Zenit Kazan, 2012 Olympic Games.

Sporting achievements

Clubs

CEV Champions League
  2008/2009 – with Iskra Odintsovo
  2013/2014 – with Lokomotiv Novosibirsk
  2015/2016 – with Zenit Kazan
  2016/2017 – with Zenit Kazan
  2017/2018 – with Zenit Kazan
  2018/2019 – with Zenit Kazan

FIVB Club World Championship
  2013 – with Lokomotiv Novosibirsk
  2016 – with Zenit Kazan
  2017 – with Zenit Kazan
  2019 – with Zenit Kazan

National championships
 2003/2004  Russian Championship, with Dynamo Moscow
 2007/2008  Russian Championship, with Iskra Odintsovo
 2008/2009  Russian Championship, with Iskra Odintsovo
 2013/2014  Russian Championship, with Lokomotiv Novosibirsk
 2015/2016  Russian Championship, with Zenit Kazan
 2016/2017  Russian Championship, with Zenit Kazan
 2017/2018  Russian Championship, with Zenit Kazan
 2018/2019  Russian Championship, with Zenit Kazan
 2019/2020  Russian Championship, with Zenit Kazan

National team
 2011  FIVB World League
 2011  FIVB World Cup
 2012  Olympic Games
 2017  CEV European Championship

Individual
 2017 FIVB Club World Championship – Best Setter
 2018 CEV Champions League – Best Setter

References

Living people
1986 births
Sportspeople from Grodno
Naturalised citizens of Russia
Russian men's volleyball players
Olympic gold medalists for Russia
Olympic medalists in volleyball
Volleyball players at the 2012 Summer Olympics
Medalists at the 2012 Summer Olympics
Olympic volleyball players of Russia
Setters (volleyball)
20th-century Russian people
21st-century Russian people